The Jawziyyah Institute was established in 1999 in the UK by Abu Aaliyah. It tries to raise the general knowledge and awareness of Islam. The institute's members have been invited to speak at forums and events ranging from the Canary Wharf Muslim Association to The City Circle.

The founder has translated several book from Arabic to English including:

 Tenets of Faith
 Etiquettes of Differing
 The Exquisite Pearl

External links
Official website

1999 establishments in the United Kingdom
Islamic organisations based in the United Kingdom